Bhate is an Indian surname.

 Anand Bhate (born 1971), Indian classical vocalist from the Kirana gharana. 
 Rohini Bhate (1924–2008), the senior most Kathak dance exponents in India.
 Shama Bhate (born 1950), one among the Kathak exponents in India. 
 Jaelem Bhate, Canadian conductor, composer, and bandleader

Surnames of Indian origin